Richard Henry Carmichael (11 April 1913 – 14 April 1983) was a flag officer in the United States Air Force and a highly decorated bomber pilot. He twice received the Distinguished Service Cross. Carmichael piloted the first B-29 Superfortress to be shot down over Japan in World War II, while leading the 462d Bombardment Group in the bombing of Yawata on 20 August 1944, the first daylight air raid on Japan since the Doolittle Raid in 1942. He remained a prisoner of war until he was liberated on 29 August 1945. During the Korean War, he flew another 39 combat missions as commander of the 98th Bombardment Group. He was commandant of the Air Command and Staff College, before he retired from the Air Force on 19 January 1961.

Early life
Carmichael was born in Hillsboro, Texas, on 11 April 1913, the son of Horace and Fay Carmichael. He graduated from Main Avenue High School in 1930, and then the West Point Preparatory School at Fort Sam Houston, Texas. He won a competitive appointment to the United States Military Academy in West Point, New York, through the Texas National Guard. He entered West Point on 1 July 1932. He graduated 92nd out of 278 in the class of 1936 on 12 June 1936, and was commissioned as a second lieutenant in the Field Artillery. On 12 September 1936 he reported to the Air Corps Training Center at Randolph Field, near San Antonio, Texas, where he received flight training. He transferred to the United States Army Air Corps on 1 October 1937.  Before departing to his first assignment, in the Territory of Hawaii, he returned to New York, and married Muriel Edith Wright, to whom he had become engaged when he was a cadet. They had four sons. From 20 November 1937, to 13 March 1939, he was the Armament Officer and Supply Officer of the 6th Pursuit Squadron, which was based at Wheeler Field in Hawaii. He was promoted to first lieutenant on 12 June 1939.

World War II
Carmichael commanded the 9th Bombardment Squadron of the 7th Bombardment Group from September 1940 to December 1941. He was promoted to captain in the Army of the United States on 9 September 1940, and major on 15 November 1941. He then became commander of the 88th Reconnaissance Squadron. His Boeing B-17 Flying Fortresses departed for the Philippines, but on reaching Hawaii found Hickam Field under attack by the Japanese. He landed his plane at the Haleiwa Fighter Strip. He was awarded the Distinguished Flying Cross. The 88th Reconnaissance Squadron did not proceed to the Philippines, but moved to Australia in February 1942. There, Carmichael become commander of the newly formed 40th Reconnaissance Squadron. As such, he despatched the B-17s that effected Douglas MacArthur's escape from the Philippines in March 1942.

Carmichael was awarded the Silver Star for a night raid on Rabaul on 23 February 1942. A dozen B-17s were flown to Cloncurry for the mission, the first raid on Rabaul, but without ground crews, the aircrew had to perform their own maintenance, and three bombers could not be made ready due to mechanical problems. The RAAF made available two experienced PBY Catalina pilots to help with navigation, Wing Commander Julius Cohen, and Pilot Officer Norman Robertson, since there were no navigation aids or reliable charts. The bombers flew to Garbutt Field in Townsville, where one bomber's engine refused to run, and two collided in the darkness, reducing the number of aircraft in the mission to six. Severe weather conditions were encountered which caused one bomber to turn back. The rest reached the target area only to find it obscured by low clouds and volcanic steam. They dropped their bombs and were attacked by fighters. Carmichael's bomber was riddled with bullet holes, and the radio operator and tail gunner were lightly wounded, but all were able to return to Port Moresby, and thence back to Townsville. The results were officially recorded as "unobserved", but Carmichael did not believe that they hit anything.

Promoted to lieutenant colonel on 1 March 1942, Carmichael was director of bombing at Allied Air Forces, Southwest Pacific Area from 26 March 1942 until 7 July 1942, when he became commander of the 19th Bombardment Group. He was awarded the Distinguished Service Cross for another raid on Rabaul on 7 August 1942. This time the commander of the Allied Air Forces, Major General George Kenney, wanted a maximum effort to support the landing on Guadalcanal. He was hoping for twenty aircraft, but only 16 were operational. One bomber cracked up on takeoff from Port Moresby at 07:30, and two more had to abort with electrical or mechanical problems. The remaining thirteen bombed the target. They were then jumped by fifteen Japanese fighters. Both Carmichael's side gunners were killed, and his airplane was heavily damaged by hostile fire. The oxygen system was knocked out, forcing him to descend to low level. One bomber, flown by Captain Harl Pease was shot down. Kenney nominated Pease, who was later executed by the Japanese, for the Medal of Honor. Kenney was pleased with the results of the raid; he believed, and wrote in this post-war account, that as many as 120 Japanese aircraft might have been destroyed. In fact, damage to the target airfield was superficial, not a single Japanese plane was lost on the ground, and not one fighter was shot down, although a dozen were damaged.

The 19th Bombardment Group returned to the United States in late 1942. Carmichael served on the staff of United States Army Air Forces in Washington, D.C., as executive assistant to General Henry H. Arnold from 6 January to 26 July 1943, for which he was award the Legion of Merit. On 26 August 1943, he became commander of the 462d Bombardment Group, flying the Boeing B-29 Superfortress from Walker Army Airfield in Kansas. The 462d Bombardment Group flew to the China Burma India Theater via Africa between March and June 1944, where it became part of the Twentieth Air Force. On 20 August he was shot down over Japan. He was awarded an oak leaf cluster to his Distinguished Service Cross:
He was also awarded the Distinguished Flying Cross and Legion of Merit for his command of the 462d Bombardment Group.

Later life 
Carmichael was a prisoner of war until he was liberated on 29 August 1945, after the surrender of Japan. After repatriation and a period of hospitalization, he was posted to the Air Materiel Command at Wright Field in Ohio from 8 February to 30 August 1946. He attended the Air Command and Staff School. Upon graduation, he was assigned to the staff of the Air University as chief of the Air Power Employment Branch, Evaluation Division on 7 July 1947. Having reverted to his permanent rank of captain in the Air Corps on 12 June 1946, he was promoted to lieutenant colonel in the new United States Air Force on 1 July 1948.

On 1 July 1949, he assumed command of the 11th Bombardment Group at Carswell Air Force Base near Fort Worth, Texas. On 1 April 1950, he became commander of the 98th Bombardment Group at Spokane Army Airfield in Washington state. The 98th Bombardment Group moved to Yokota Air Base in Japan in August 1950 to participate in the Korean War, and he flew another 39 combat missions in Korea. He was awarded another oak leaf cluster to his Legion of Merit, and one to his Silver Star for leading a bombing raid on Sinuiju, the temporary capital of North Korea, on 8 November 1950. An important supply and communications center, it lay only  from Andong, a Chinese city on the other side of the Yalu River. This restricted the approaches to the city, which were covered by anti-aircraft guns. In view of the danger of a border incursion into Manchuria, Carmichael led the mission.

Returning to the United States, he became commander of the 93d Bombardment Wing on 16 April 1951. In October 1951, he was reassigned to Travis Air Force Base in California as commander 14th Air Division. He was promoted to brigadier general on 8 March 1952. In May 1953 he returned to the Far East as commander of the Far East Air Force Bomber Command from 15 June to 27 July 1953, for which he was awarded a third oak leaf cluster to his Legion of Merit. At this stage, the Korean War was in its final throes. The Chinese had begun concentrating large numbers of aircraft in the Andong area, and it was feared that if the airfields in North Korea were not kept out of action they would be deployed to North Korea. Since the proposed Korean Armistice Agreement permitted a retention of the status quo of forces in North Korea, this might allow the creation of a large air force in North Korea in the last weeks of the war, which would then become a permanent feature. To prevent this, Carmichael instituted a program of keeping the airfields unusable, using nightly attacks by his medium bombers on airfields and installations at Uiju, Sinuiju, Samchan, Taechon, Pyongyong and Pyong Ni. This was conducted in the face of an intense enemy rebuilding effort, and in the teeth of anti-aircraft artillery and jet interceptors, but he was still able to keep the airfield non-operational, and no aircraft were shot down or aircrew lost. The last mission was flown just ten hours before the armistice came into effect.

After this, Carmichael returned to Headquarters U.S. Air Force in Washington, D.C., as the deputy director, and then the director, of personnel procurement and training from 16 May 1954 to 11 July 1958. With the Korean War over, he was able to concentrate on the Air Force's longer-term requirements. These included absorbing reserve officers into the regular Air Force; the development of re-enlistment programs for both officers and enlisted men to boost their retention in the Air Force; the creation of re-training programs; and the establishment of selection criteria for cadets at the new United States Air Force Academy. For this he was awarded a fourth oak leaf cluster to his Legion of Merit. On 11 July 1958 Carmichael took up his final posting, as the commandant of the Air University's Air Command and Staff College. He retired from the Air Force on 19 January 1961.

Carmichael died in Washington, D.C., on 14 April 1983, and was buried in Arlington National Cemetery.

Awards and decorations

Dates of rank

Notes

References

 

 

 

1913 births
1983 deaths
Air Command and Staff College alumni
United States Army personnel of World War II
United States Air Force generals
United States Military Academy alumni
People from Hillsboro, Texas
Recipients of the Air Medal
Recipients of the Legion of Merit
Recipients of the Silver Star
Recipients of the Distinguished Flying Cross (United Kingdom)
Recipients of the Distinguished Service Cross (United States)
Recipients of the Distinguished Flying Cross (United States)
Burials at Arlington National Cemetery
Military personnel from Texas
Shot-down aviators
World War II prisoners of war held by Japan
American prisoners of war in World War II